Glutaminyl-tRNA synthetase is an enzyme that in humans is encoded by the QARS gene.

Function 

Aminoacyl-tRNA synthetases catalyze the aminoacylation of tRNA by their cognate amino acid. Because of their central role in linking amino acids with nucleotide triplets contained in tRNAs, aminoacyl-tRNA synthetases are thought to be among the first proteins that appeared in evolution. In metazoans, 9 aminoacyl-tRNA synthetases specific for glutamine (gln), glutamic acid (glu), and 7 other amino acids are associated within a multienzyme complex. Although present in eukaryotes, glutaminyl-tRNA synthetase (QARS) is absent from many prokaryotes, mitochondria, and chloroplasts, in which Gln-tRNA(Gln) is formed by transamidation of the misacylated Glu-tRNA(Gln). Glutaminyl-tRNA synthetase belongs to the class-I aminoacyl-tRNA synthetase family. Almost all eukaryotic GlnRS enzymes possess a YqeY domain at the N-terminus, which affects affinity for the tRNA; in some bacterial species, such as Deinococcus radiodurans, YqeY is present as a C-terminal domain with similar function.

Interactions 

QARS has been shown to interact with RARS.

References

Further reading